Séléka CPSK-CPJP-UFDR was an alliance of rebel militia groups that subjugated the Central African Republic (CAR) on 24 March 2013. After its official dissolution in September 2013, the remaining rebel groups became known as Ex-Séléka. Séléka leader Michel Djotodia became the nation's president from March 2013 until his resignation in January 2014. Members of Séléka were almost all Muslim.

Name
The word seleka means "coalition" in Sango, one of the CAR's two national languages, the other being French. The international media has shortened the full name Séléka CPSK-CPJP-UFDR to la Séléka in French or often Seleka in English.

The term Séléka had been used previously in CAR politics when Jean-Jacques Démafouth launched the political party New Alliance for Progress with the Sango name Fini Seleka.

Background
The rebel coalition originated in an agreement signed between factions of the Convention of Patriots for Justice and Peace (CPJP) and the Patriotic Convention for Saving the Country (CPSK), two of the CAR's many anti-government militias on 20 August 2012. CPJP in this case refers to the "Fundamental" splinter group of the CPJP, one of many militias involved in the CAR's long-running civil war. A different faction of the CPJP signed a peace accord with the government on 25 August 2012.

The Séléka first emerged on 15 September 2012 under the name alliance CPSK-CPJP, when it published a press release taking responsibility for the attacks on three towns that day. It was the last of the major rebel groups to do so. The CPSK was hardly known. On 15 December 2012 the group published its first press release using the full name "Séléka CPSK-CPJP-UFDR" thus including the Union of Democratic Forces for Unity (UFDR). Two groups that did not appear in the title, the long-standing militia Democratic Front of the Central African People (FDPC), and the newly minted Alliance for Revival and Rebuilding (A2R), were also reportedly part of the alliance.

The Séléka weren't an overtly religious movement, but they were mostly Muslim, as was Michel Djotodia, the president they installed in March 2013 after taking power.

Civil War
The fighters that ushered in Djotodia ran wild across the country during his time in office, plundering villages and killing Christians as well as supporters of the former president Francois Bozize.

In September 2013 Michel Djotodia announced that Séléka had been dissolved. The disbanded group has dispersed into the countryside and have been committing mass atrocities according to Human Rights Watch. Executions, rape and looting by ex-Séléka fighters after the coup and disbanding have fomented religious tension where the population is 80% Christian. Christian militias, using the name anti-balaka, have been formed to fight the Muslim Séléka. In response, the United Nations considered sending troops to stop the atrocities, and established the MINUSCA peacekeeping mission in September 2014.

Ex-Séléka militias

By 2015, there was virtually no government control outside of the capital, Bangui. Armed entrepreneurs have carved out personal fiefdoms in which they set up checkpoints, collect illegal taxes, and take in millions of dollars from the illicit coffee, mineral, and timber trades.

Months after the official dissolution of Séléka, it was not known who was in charge of Ex-Séléka factions during talks with Antibalaka. On 12 July 2014, Michel Djotodia was reinstated as the head of a faction of Séléka, which renamed itself The Popular Front for the Rebirth of Central African Republic (FPRC), also translated as "The Popular Front for the Renaissance of Central African Republic". Later in 2014, Noureddine Adam led the FPRC and began demanding independence for the predominantly Muslim north, a move rejected by another general, Ali Darassa. He formed another Ex-Séléka faction called the Union for Peace in the Central African Republic (UPC) which is dominant in and around Bambari while the FPRC's capital is in Bria. Noureddine Adam declared the autonomous Republic of Logone on 14 December 2015; a spokesman for the Central African Republic's transitional government denounced the rebel's declaration. Another group is the Central African Patriotic Movement (MPC) founded by Mahamat Al Khatim. Much of the violence in this phase of the conflict is between Ex-Séléka militias and is often ethnic in nature with the FPRC targeting Fulani people who largely make up the UPC and the UPC targeting the Gula and Runga people, who largely make up FPRC, as being sympathetic to FPRC. Starting in November 2016, FPRC and MPC allied with their former enemy, the Anti-balaka, and attacked UPC. Most of the fighting is in the centrally located Ouaka prefecture, which has the country's second largest city Bambari, because of its strategic location between the Muslim and Christian regions of the country and its wealth. The fighting displaced 20,000 with the FPRC singling out Fulani people. In February 2017, Joseph Zoundeiko, the chief of staff of FPRC who previously led the military wing of Séléka, was killed by MINUSCA after crossing one of the red lines.

Atrocities
On 18 September 2013, the Séléka killed scores of unarmed civilians, according to Human Rights Watch. The Séléka has also engaged in wanton destruction of numerous homes and villages. The 79-page report The Forgotten Human Rights Crisis in the Central African Republic details the deliberate killing of civilians – including women, children, and the elderly – between March and June 2013 and confirms the deliberate destruction of more than 1,000 homes, both in the capital, Bangui, and in the provinces. Many villagers have fled their homes and are living in the bush in fear of new attacks. Human Rights Watch documented the deaths of scores of people from injuries, hunger or sickness.

"Séléka leaders promised a new beginning for the people of the Central African Republic, but instead have carried out large-scale attacks on civilians, looting, and murder", said Daniel Bekele, Africa director at Human Rights Watch. "What's worse is that the Séléka have recruited children as young as 13 to carry out some of this carnage."

On 28 May 2014, the Séléka members threw grenades before shooting indiscriminately at the Church of Fatima in the capital Bangui, killing at least 11 people. In July 2014, the government of Uganda declared that it was at war with Séléka, accusing them of forcing civilians to give food and medicine to the Lord's Resistance Army and of trading ivory and minerals with them. Séléka denied the accusation.

Séléka leader Abdoulaye Issene said in an interview that: "We have killed, murdered and violated, but what happened, happened".

On 9 November 2015, armed men cut the throats of 10 people in the village of Ndassima before carrying out an overnight attack nearby in Mala. Local administrator Yves Mbetigaza said "They came from two places, some from Bambari and others from Mbres." While a report on national radio described the attackers only as armed members of the Fula ethnic group (in ), Mbetigaza said they were Séléka fighters, adding that eight villagers were kidnapped in Mala and dozens of others were missing. On 12 November, six hunters were killed in the village of Bandambou.

On 3 December 2015, the Séléka armed men killed eight civilians at a camp for displaced people and wounded one U.N. peacekeeper, just days after the pope visited the capital. The attacks took place at Ngakobo, about 60 km (40 miles) south of the central town of Bambari.

Séléka often contends that mercenaries are to blame for the abuses. It is reported that official Séléka fighters are called for help to protect against mobs of ex-Séléka fighters.

In October 2021, Confirmation of charges hearings against ex-Séléka militiaman Mahamat Saïd opens before the International Criminal Court (ICC). This former militiaman is suspected of crimes against humanity and war crimes committed in 2013 and 2014. This is the first time that a former member of the Séléka has faced the judges of the Court.

Notes

References

 Central African Republic: Horrific Abuses by New Rulers 

Factions of the Central African Republic Civil War
Islam in the Central African Republic
Islamic terrorism
Persecution of Christians by Muslims
Rebel groups in the Central African Republic